Enrico Rossi is the name of:
Enrico Rossi Chauvenet (born 1984), Italian footballer
Enrico Rossi (cyclist) (born 1982), Italian former professional road racing cyclist. He retired in 2014
Enrico Rossi (politician) (born 1958), Italian politician
Enrico Rossi (painter) (Naples, 1856–1916,1856–1916), Italian painter
Enrico Rossi (beach volleyball)